Årnset (also known as Rissa) is the administrative centre of the municipality of Indre Fosen in Trøndelag county, Norway.

Rissa Church, Rein Church, and Rein Abbey are all located in and around Årnset.

References

Villages in Trøndelag
Indre Fosen
Rissa, Norway